The following is a list of islands that form the Falkland Islands.

Main islands

Other islands

Small archipelagos

Jason Islands
None of the Jason Islands are permanently inhabited.

Highest islands

List of Falkland Islands named after people
This is a short list of islands, which are known to be named after someone. Until at least 1781, the Falklands as a whole were known as the Sebald or Sebaldine Island after Sebald de Weert, who sighted them and tried to make landfall on the Jason Islands in January 1600.

 Beauchene Island - Jacques Gouin de Beauchêne
 Dunbar Island
 (East Falkland) Lafonia (peninsula) - Samuel Fisher Lafone
 George Island - ? King George
 Golding Island
 Jason Islands
 Keppel Island - Augustus Keppel
 Saunders Island
 Ruggles Island
 Staats Island
 Tyssen Islands - John Tyssen (1811–1893), British naval officer 
 Weddell Island - James Weddell

Spanish names derived from people
A list of the derivations of Spanish names, where they differ substantially from the English versions.
 Beaver Island - Isla San Rafael - The archangel Raphael
 Lively Island - Isla Bougainville - Louis Antoine de Bougainville
 Bleaker Island - Isla María - ?Virgin Mary
 Jason Islands - Isla Sebaldes - Sebald de Weert
 Pebble Island - Isla (de) Borbón/Isla Bourbon - House of Bourbon
 Weddell Island - Isla San José - Saint Joseph

See also
 Falkland Islands
 Geography of the Falkland Islands
 List of Falkland Islands-related topics
 List of islands by area
 List of islands by highest point
 List of islands by population
 List of islands in lakes
 List of islands in the Atlantic Ocean

References

External links

 Islands of the Falkland Islands @ United Nations Environment Programme
 
 World island information @ WorldIslandInfo.com

 
Falkland Islands-related lists
Falkland Islands